Waqar Ahmad Khan  (born 15 October 1967 – 30 April 2022) was a Pakistani politician and member of the Provincial Assembly of Khyber Pakhtunkhwa. Khan belonged to the Awami National Party. He died on 30 April 2022.

See also
Politics of Pakistan

References

1967 births
2022 deaths
People from Swat District
Awami National Party politicians
Awami National Party MPAs (Khyber Pakhtunkhwa)
Politicians from Khyber Pakhtunkhwa